Gerald Greenspan (November 22, 1941 – September 11, 2019) was an American basketball player. Greenspan, who was 6' 7", 275 lbs. played shooting guard.

College
Born and raised in Newark, New Jersey, he played at the University of Maryland. Greenspan led the team in scoring and rebounds in 1962 and 1963. He received an honorable mention for the 1963 All-American team, and was named to the second team for the All-Atlantic Coast Conference. He had 501 rebounds during his college career.

NBA
He was drafted by the Syracuse Nationals in the third round of the 1963 NBA draft. Greenspan remained with the team until his retirement at the end of the 1964–65 NBA season.

Hall of Fame

Greenspan, who was Jewish, was inducted into the MetroWest Jewish Sports Hall of Fame in 2005.

See also
List of select Jewish basketball players

References

External links
Basketball Reference stats

1941 births
2019 deaths
American men's basketball players
Basketball players from Newark, New Jersey
Jewish men's basketball players
Maryland Terrapins men's basketball players
Philadelphia 76ers players
Shooting guards
Small forwards
Syracuse Nationals draft picks
Weequahic High School alumni